Gloria Gill is a Barbadian former cricketer who played as a right-handed batter. She appeared in ten Test matches and two One Day Internationals for the West Indies between 1976 and 1979. She made her debut for the West Indies in May 1976, playing against Australia. Her highest Test score was 53, made against India later that year. In all, she scored 273 Test runs and 46 ODI runs. She played domestic cricket for Barbados.

References

External links
 
 

Living people
Date of birth missing (living people)
Year of birth missing (living people)
West Indian women cricketers
West Indies women Test cricketers
West Indies women One Day International cricketers
Barbadian women cricketers